The GE CM20EMP diesel-electric locomotives (also known as CC206 in Indonesia) are owned by Kereta Api Indonesia (Indonesian Railways Co.) and built by GE Transportation. The GE CM20EMPs are multipurpose locomotives, not only for hauling passenger trains (i.e. executive class, business class, or economy class), but also freight trains.

The locomotives' operation have started in 2013, and become Indonesian Railway's main workhorses for hauling trains. These locomotives are operated along the Java main line for hauling freight and passenger train, and along South-Sumatra and Lampung Line for hauling freights. They are double-cabin, and the most active double-cabin locomotives in Indonesia.

History 
The first double cabin locomotives were the GE CM20EMP's predecessors, such as CC200s (Alco-GE UM 106T), BB301s and BB304s (Krupp M1500BB), and BB305s (built by CFD). While they were once used for express passenger train duty, they are now mostly operated as switchers and haulers of local trains, or have been withdrawn.

Between 2000 and 2010 the Indonesian Railways Co. decided to modernize existing diesel-electric locomotives such as previously owned CC204s (C20EMP locomotives). But, with the increasing cost of maintenance, parts, fuel and workers, caused by aging and inefficient locomotives, in 2010, the company decided to buy new diesel-electric locomotives to be added to its rolling stock. But, due to the latest rule from Indonesia Government's Ministry of Transportation, every new locomotive should have no 'long-hood' position, to decrease the number of accidents. This is related to limit sight of the engineer when the locomotives move on long-hood position.

By September 2012 the company had bought 100 locomotives of the CM20EMP type and these have been operated since 2013.  The locomotives were supplied without bogies and the bogies were assembled by Barata Indonesia. When the ship that carried the locomotives arrived in Tanjung Priok Port, the locomotives were brought to Indonesian Railways Locomotive Workshop in Pengok, Yogyakarta, to be assembled with bogies from barata, and complete their dynamics and statics test.

Additional 50 locomotives were ordered in 2014, with the first-39-locos arriving on 14 August 2015, and directly be brought to Pengok, Yogyakarta. After test, 28 locomotives numbered from CC 206 112 (CC 206 15 12) till CC 206 139 (CC 206 15 39) were transferred to Kertapati, South Sumatra by Panjang port, to haul coal trains in south Sumatra.

The last-11-locos arrived in Tanjung Priok Port on 14 July 2016. Same as before, the locomotives were brought to Pengok, Yogyakarta, and start the same process as before. after test, the locomotives were transferred to south Sumatra again, to fulfill the lack of locomotives' need for coal trains.

Features

Body 
The CM20EMPs were made when Indonesian Railways Co. needed a double-cab locomotive.  The cab and body are similar to the British Rail Class 70 (GE PowerHaul series), but the front windows are like the Indonesian GE U20Cs of class CC203. The headlights and cab doors are like another (unspecified) Indonesian U20C.

Engines, specifications, and electronic devices 
These locomotives use a new version of the GE 7FDL-8 engine that meets the same emission standards as the GE Dash 9 Series locomotives. The power output of CM20EMPs is 2,250 horsepower, equal to that of EMD G26, and 100 hp more than the 2,150 hp CC203s/GE U20C. Meanwhile, the tractive effort of these locomotives is as much as 248 kN (starting) and 207 kN (continuous). These locomotives are equipped with GE BrightStar™ computer systems, integrated with the GE Integrated Function Display™. The CC206s have different horns from the previous GE locos in Indonesia. While its predecessors use Wabco AA2 with factory note tuned to D,G (play perfect 4th mid C), the CC206 locomotives use Nathan 3rd gen P2 (Bell No.1&4) with factory note tuned to D,A (play perfect 5th mid C), (Unlike the other P2 using Bell No.1&2 play minor 3rd).

One unit of CC206 locomotive could haul up to 16 passenger cars or 30 freight cars.

Allocations 
All CC206 units manufactured in 2013, as well as CC206 numbered from 01 (CC 206 15 01) till 08 (CC 206 15 08) and 11 (CC 206 15 11) are operated in Java, Whulst the rest of CC206 which arrived in 2015 ( from CC206 15 12 till CC 206 15 39), arrived in 2016 (from CC 206 16 01 till CC 206 16 11) and locomotives from Sidotopo, East Java (CC 206 15 09 and 10) which were arrived in early 2021 are now operated in South Sumatra, and allocated to motive power depot (dipo induk) Kertapati, Palembang.

Accidents 
 On 12 September 2013, a conflagration destroyed a residence settlement, at Malang. As a consequence, the locomotive numbered CC206 13 16 was burnt. The witness said that the fire started in a  house, where someone was cooking and spread from there. After that, the fire flamed and licked a Honda Supra motorcycle parked 2 metres from the stove. Then, the fire burnt all of the kitchen. Because the kitchen distance was just 2 metres from the rail that headed to Pertamina depot, the fire also burnt the CC206 13 16 that was shunting an oil train. The locomotive (CC206 13 16) was heavily damaged on its A-side. All the victims were injured on their feet and faces.
 On 4 April 2014, at 18:30 West Indonesian Time, the Malabar train was derailed at Tasikmalaya, West Java due to a landslide. Finally, the two executive class coaches numbered K1 0 67 27 and K1 0 67 22 and the locomotive numbered CC206 13 55 jumped off completely from the rail. Because of heavy mountainous terrain and inaccessible location, the evacuation of CC206 13 55 was obstructed.
 On 4 May 2014, the locomotive numbered CC206 13 69 and a power car (P 0 08 01) that hauled Bogowonto train was derailed after crashing into a modified container truck at Cirebon, West Java. There were no fatalities, but the locomotive driver and a number of passengers were injured. The incident caused interruption of timetables, and the evacuation ran with difficulties because of the heavy weight of the CC206.

See also 
 List of GE locomotives

References

External links 

  

Diesel-electric locomotives of Indonesia
CM20EMP
Railway locomotives introduced in 2012
3 ft 6 in gauge locomotives of Indonesia
Co′Co′ locomotives